Mary Campbell may refer to:
Mary Campbell (colonial settler) (1747/8–1801), American colonial settler
Mary Katherine Campbell (1905–1990), two-time winner of the Miss America pageant
Mary Baine Campbell, poet and scholar
Mary Dranga Campbell (1867–1957), activist for the blind
Mary Schmidt Campbell (born 1947), dean at New York University
Mary Campbell (figure skater), American retired figure skater
Mary Campbell, Countess of Breadalbane and Holland, English noblewoman
Mary Winchester (Supernatural), née Mary Campbell, a character in the TV series Supernatural
Mary Edith Campbell, suffragist and social economist
Mary Campbell (Highland Mary) (1763–1786), linked romantically with Robert Burns
Mary Greig Campbell (1907–1989), New Zealand librarian and Quaker
Mary Campbell, Countess of Argyll (1628–1668)

See also 
Mary Campbell Cave, Ohio, U.S.A.